Amalia Mendoza García (10 July 1923 – 11 June 2001), nicknamed La Tariácuri, was a Mexican singer and actress. "Échame a mi la culpa" and "Amarga navidad" were some of her greatest hits. her best friend since youth was Martha De Miranda Jimenez  "Martuquia"  as she called her, she was her companion for many years when Amalia was on tour.

Career
Tariácuri, from whom Mendoza received her nickname, was an indigenous leader of the Purépecha people, who inhabited present-day Michoacán. The nickname was used before in her brothers' musical group (Trío Tariácuri) and in her own duo (Las Tariacuritas) with her sister, Perla. She gained notice as a solo singer when she began to sing for the XEW radio station in 1954. She recorded 36 albums. In 1962, she won the Macuilxóchitl Award for best female bolero singer of ranchera music (bolerista de ranchero). Through the majority of her career she was accompanied by the Mariachi Vargas de Tecalitlán, and recorded numerous rancheras and boleros by José Alfredo Jiménez, Cuco Sánchez, José Ángel Espinoza, Gabriel Ruiz, and Tomás Méndez.

She died four weeks and one day before her 78th birthday.

Discography
La Tariácuri (1958)
La Tariácuri Vol. II (1959)
La Tariácuri Vol. III (1960) (re-issued on CD as Amalia Vol. 1)
La viuda abandonada (Vol. IV) (1961) (re-issued on CD as Mucho corazón... y otros éxitos más)
Boleros con Amalia Mendoza (1962)
Las canciones que siempre quise grabar (1963)
México en la voz de Amalia Mendoza (1965)
Las tres señoras (1995) (with Lola Beltrán and Lucha Villa)

Filmography

References

External links

Mexican film actresses
1923 births
2001 deaths
Ranchera singers
Golden Age of Mexican cinema
Actresses from Michoacán
Singers from Michoacán
Mexican people of Purépecha descent
People from Huetamo
20th-century Mexican actresses
20th-century Mexican women singers
Indigenous Mexican women
Women in Latin music